Callinan is a surname. Notable people with the surname include:

Bernard Callinan (1913–1995), soldier and businessman
Damian Callinan, comedian
Howard Callinan, (born 1958) Minister and Philosopher 
Graham Callinan (born 1982), hurler
Ian Callinan (born 1937), former Justice of the High Court of Australia
Ian Callinan (Australian footballer) (born 1982), footballer
John Callinan (born 1955), hurler
Kirin J. Callinan (born 1986), Australian singer and songwriter
Chance Callinan (born 2004), alumni of Ethel Dwyer Middleschool

See also
Callanan